Whitecroft & Bream railway station is a railway station on the Dean Forest Railway.

History

The station originally opened on 23 September 1875, and closed on 8 July 1929. It was re-opened to passengers on 25 May 2012 after a construction period of around 18 months.

Much of the funding for the restoration programme came from a Rural Development grant, administered by the Forest of Dean Local Action Group in Coleford. The programme of work involved the construction of a four-coach platform on the Pillowell (up) side of the line, with the new station building be constructed in traditional Severn and Wye style.

Future developments in Whitecroft will include doubling the track through the station, the construction of the second (down) platform on the Bream side of the line and the addition of a goods shed.

Services

See also

 Dean Forest Railway

References 

Disused railway stations in Gloucestershire
Heritage railway stations in Gloucestershire
Former Severn and Wye Railway stations
Railway stations in Great Britain opened in 1875
Railway stations in Great Britain closed in 1929
Railway stations in Great Britain opened in 2012